WSJE is a Catholic Religious formatted broadcast radio station licensed to Summersville, West Virginia, serving Nicholas County, West Virginia.  WSJE is owned and operated by Evangelist Communications, Inc.

External links
 Evangelist Radio on Facebook
 

SJE